The Desplaines Yard (also known as the Forest Park Yard) is a CTA rail yard in Forest Park, Illinois which stores cars for the Blue Line of the Chicago Transit Authority. Currently, 2600-series and 3200-series  railcars are stored here. It is adjacent to Forest Park station.

References 

Chicago Transit Authority
Forest Park, Illinois